Zechariah "Junior" Lord (born March 11, 1976) is a former American football wide receiver. He now is an owner of Jardin Dispensary in Las Vegas and serves as Chief Marketing Officer

College career
He attended Guilford College in North Carolina and played from 1994–1997.  He holds the receiving records there. Was the 1st player in conference history to receive all conference four years in a row. Was named honorable mention All-American as a junior and All-American honors as a Senior.

Professional career

NFL
Lord entered the National Football League as a free agent in 1998, signing with the Washington Redskins. He would spend 1 season on their practice squad. In 1999, he was released from the Washington Redskins after final roster cuts during the preseason and signed on with the Pittsburgh Steelers to their practice squad. In 2000, he signed with the Green Bay Packers where he was allocated to the Amsterdam Admirals of NFL Europe. Coming out of college, Lord ran a solid 4.46 in the 40 yard dash which caught the attention on scouts due to his size. He also jumped well recording a 37.5 inch vertical jump.

XFL
Lord played in the only season of the XFL being selected by the Chicago Enforcers in the 2001 XFL Draft.

AFL
Lord started his Arena Football League career by playing 2 seasons (2001–2002) for the Orlando Predators. He would go on to play for the Detroit Fury (2003–2004) and the Las Vegas Gladiators (2005–2006).

External links
arenafootball.com player profile
http://www.arenafan.com/players/?page=players&player=2938

1976 births
Living people
Sportspeople from Greenwich, Connecticut
American football wide receivers
American football linebackers
Guilford Quakers football players
Washington Redskins players
Green Bay Packers players
Amsterdam Admirals players
Orlando Predators players
Detroit Fury players
Las Vegas Gladiators players
Chicago Enforcers players